Hydnangium is a genus of truffle-like fungi in the family Hydnangiaceae. All species in this genus are known to form ectomycorrhizal associations with trees.

Species
Hydnangium aurantiacum
Hydnangium carneum
Hydnangium densum
Hydnangium latisporum
Hydnangium macalpinei
Hydnangium parksii
Hydnangium quercicola
Hydnangium sublamellatum
Hydnangium thaxteri
Hydnangium velatisporum

References

Hydnangiaceae
Agaricales genera
Taxa named by Karl Friedrich Wilhelm Wallroth